Euxenite, or euxenite-(Y) (the official mineralogical name), is a brownish black mineral with a metallic luster.

Chemistry
It contains calcium, niobium, tantalum, cerium, titanium, yttrium, and typically uranium and thorium, with some other metals. It is commonly partially amorphous due to radiation damage.

Euxenite forms a continuous series with the titanium rich polycrase-(Y) having the formula .

Name and discovery
It was first described in 1870 and named for from the Greek (εὔξενος), hospitable or friendly to strangers, in allusion to the many rare elements that it contains.

Occurrence
It occurs in granite pegmatites and detrital black sands.

It is found in many locations worldwide, notably its type locality in  	Jølster, Sunnfjord, Norway. Other locations include the Ural Mountains of Russia; Sweden; Minas Gerais, Brazil; Ampangabe, Madagascar; Ontario, Canada; and in Arizona, Wyoming and Colorado in the US.

Use
Euxenite is used as an ore of the rare earth elements it contains. Rare large crystals have also been used in jewelry.

References

Calcium minerals
Thorium minerals
Uranium minerals
Lanthanide minerals
Niobium minerals
Tantalum minerals
Titanium minerals
Yttrium minerals
Cerium minerals
Oxide minerals
Orthorhombic minerals
Minerals in space group 62
Minerals described in 1870